Elizabeth Fitzgerald may refer to:

Elizabeth FitzGerald, Countess of Lincoln (1527–1590), also known as The Fair Geraldine, Irish noblewoman and member of the FitzGerald dynasty
Elizabeth Grey, Countess of Kildare (born 1497), English noblewoman, and the second wife of Irish peer Gerald FitzGerald, 9th Earl of Kildare
Duffy Ayers (1915–2017), English portrait painter
Elizabeth Fitzgerald (volleyball) (born 1980), American volleyball player